Oxytoma is an extinct genus of bivalve molluscs that lived from the Late Permian to the early Paleocene, with a worldwide distribution except Australia. The genus was named in 1864 by Fielding Bradford Meek.

References 

Prehistoric bivalve genera
Permian bivalves
Triassic bivalves
Jurassic bivalves
Cretaceous bivalves
Paleogene bivalves
Prehistoric animals of Africa
Prehistoric animals of Antarctica
Prehistoric animals of Asia
Prehistoric molluscs of Europe
Prehistoric bivalves of North America
Mesozoic animals of South America
Lopingian first appearances
Paleocene genus extinctions
Fossil taxa described in 1864
Pectinida